NH 16 may refer to:

 National Highway 16 (India)
 New Hampshire Route 16, United States